Vermont Yankee Nuclear Power Corp. v. Natural Resources Defense Council, 435 U.S. 519 (1978), is a case in which the United States Supreme Court held that a court cannot impose rulemaking procedures on a federal government agency. The federal Administrative Procedure Act of 1946 and an agency's statutory mandate from Congress establish the maximum requirements for an agency's rulemaking (and adjudicative) process. An agency may grant additional procedural rights in the regulatory process (within constitutional and statutory limits). However, a reviewing court cannot "impose upon the agency its own notion of which procedures are 'best' or most likely to further some vague, undefined public good"; to do so would exceed the limits of judicial review of agency action.

Background 
Throughout the 1960s and 1970s, the United States Court of Appeals for the District of Columbia Circuit became the preeminent administrative law court in the United States. This was in large part due to the creation of new federal statutes such as the Clean Air Act that designated the D.C. Circuit as the center for challenges of regulations issued under said statutes. The D.C. Circuit subsequently expanded administrative law jurisprudence significantly, particularly jurisprudence on informal rulemaking that enhanced judicial review of agency procedures. Underlying most of this jurisprudence was a distrust of federal agencies that came to fruition during this time due to concerns about agency capture.

Aftermath
In its decision, the Supreme Court "could not have made plainer its view that the D.C. Circuit had overstepped its proper role and illegitimately used its judicial review function to advance its judges’ own policy preferences." While the holding in Vermont Yankee was "certainly broad enough to suggest that courts should stick to the original understanding of the APA with respect to [the APA's requirements that agencies issue a notice of proposed rulemaking and a statement of basis and purpose]," courts have not applied it in that way.

The case was remanded for the circuit court to determine whether the Table S-3 rule was adequately supported by the administrative record. After the Nuclear Regulatory Commission revised the rule, the Natural Resources Defense Council filed for judicial review of the new regulation. That led to a second Supreme Court case, Baltimore Gas & Elec. Co. v. Natural Resources Defense Council, Inc.. 

Vermont Yankee signaled a change in administrative law jurisprudence towards legal formalism and textualism.

See also
List of United States Supreme Court cases, volume 435
Vermont Yankee Nuclear Power Plant

References

Further reading

External links

United States Supreme Court cases
United States Supreme Court cases of the Burger Court
United States administrative case law
United States energy case law
United States environmental case law
1978 in the environment
1978 in United States case law
Nuclear power in the United States
Natural Resources Defense Council